Coerr is a surname. Notable people with the surname include:

 Eleanor Coerr (1922–2010), Canadian-born American writer
 Susan DeRenne Coerr (1939–2007), American artist and educator
 Wymberley D. Coerr (died 1996), American politician and diplomat